Alan Skuse (born 28 March 1942) is an Australian cricketer. He played in one first-class match for Queensland in 1967/68.

See also
 List of Queensland first-class cricketers

References

External links
 

1942 births
Living people
Australian cricketers
Queensland cricketers
Cricketers from Brisbane